Picnic Point may refer to:
 Picnic Point, New South Wales, a suburb in Australia
 Picnic Point, Toowoomba, a park and lookout in Queensland, Australia
 Picnic Point-North Lynnwood, Washington, United States